S94 may refer to:
 S-94 (film), a 2009 science fiction/horror short film
 S94 (New York City bus) serving Staten Island
 County Route S94 (Bergen County, New Jersey)
 Port of Whitman Business Air Center Airport, in Whitman County, Washington, United States
 SIPA S.94, a French trainer aircraft